Holehouse is a hamlet in Derbyshire, England. It is located 2 miles west of Glossop, on the A626 road close to Charlesworth.

Hamlets in Derbyshire
High Peak, Derbyshire